Against Nature was the debut album from Fatima Mansions. It was released in September 1989, receiving almost universal critical acclaim, described by NME as "staggering in its weight of ideas...never loses its capacity to suddenly stun you", and also described as "a startlingly well-rounded debut". A review from Allmusic stated "Coughlan's lyrics are similarly aggressive throughout, with actions of overt and implicit violence in nearly every song and a grouchily misanthropic, almost nihilistic lyrical world-view throughout".

Against Nature reached #12 in the UK Indie Chart.

This album would later be compiled with other pre-Viva Dead Ponies work of The Fatima Mansions on the 1992 Come Back My Children compilation album, while "Only Losers Take The Bus" would also feature on the American edition of Viva Dead Ponies.

Track listing 
All tracks composed and arranged by Cathal Coughlan
 "Only Losers Take the Bus" (3:08)
 "The Day I Lost Everything" (4:16)
 "Wilderness on Time" (3:15)
 "You Won't Get Me Home" (3:01)
 "13th Century Boy" (4:00)
 "Bishop of Babel" (2:53)
 "Valley of the Dead Cars" (3:19)
 "Big Madness/Monday Club Carol" (4:38)

Personnel 
 Cathal Coughlan – vocals, keyboards, programming
 Andrías Ó Grúama – guitar
 Zac Woolhouse – keyboards
 John Fell – bass guitar
 Nicholas Tiompan Allum – drums, wind
Technical
Bill Gill, Jamie Lane, Martin Harrison, Ralph Jezzard - engineer
 Lawrence Bogle - cover illustration

References 

1989 debut albums
The Fatima Mansions albums